正月 may refer to:

Chinese New Year
Japanese New Year
Korean New Year